The Duties on Clocks and Watches Act 1797 (38 Geo. III, c. 108) was an Act of Parliament passed by the Parliament of Kingdom of Great Britain.

During the last three decades of the eighteenth century, the price of watches declined and consequently they increased in popularity. William Pitt, the Prime Minister and Chancellor of the Exchequer, decided to tax watches and clocks. The Act taxed gold watches at 10 shillings and silver and other metal watches at 2s. 6d. The Act also required makers or dealers in watches and clocks to purchase an annual license, costing 2s. 6d. in London and 1 shilling elsewhere.

However, the tax was a failure. It nearly ruined the manufacturers of clocks and watches, with demand for their products declining to such an extent that within a year the manufacture of these items diminished by half. It also caused thousands of workers employed in these trades to emigrate. Consequently, Pitt repealed the tax in April 1798.

Notes

Great Britain Acts of Parliament 1797
Repealed Great Britain Acts of Parliament